The Harleston Parker Medal was established in 1921 by J. Harleston Parker to recognize “such architects as shall have, in the opinion of the Boston Society of Architects for any private citizen, association, corporation, or public authority, the most beautiful piece of architecture, building, monument or structure within the limits of the City of Boston or of the Metropolitan Parks District”.

Projects in the Greater Boston area built in the past 10 years by any architect anywhere in the world are eligible. This area includes Arlington, Belmont, Boston, Braintree, Brookline, Cambridge, Canton, Chelsea, Dedham, Dover, Everett, Hingham, Hull, Lynn, Malden, Medford, Melrose, Milton, Nahant, Needham, Newton, Quincy, Revere, Saugus, Somerville, Stoneham, Swampscott, Wakefield, Waltham, Watertown,
Wellesley, Weston, Weymouth, Winchester, Winthrop and Woburn.

List of medal recipients

References

Architecture awards